Paidha is a town in the Northern Region of Uganda.

History 
On 13 February 1965, Paidha and Goli were bombed by the Congolese Air Force in retaliation for the support of the Ugandan government for Simba rebels. The attack caused minimal damage.

Location
Paidha is in Zombo District, West Nile sub-region. The town is near the border with the Democratic Republic of the Congo. The coordinates of Paidha are 2°25'00.0"N, 30°59'15.0"E (Latitude:2.416667; Longitude:30.987500).

Overview
Paidha is a busy border town in northwest Uganda at its border with the DRC. In 2013, it was the second-busiest border crossing between Uganda and the DRC, based on the volume of informal exports and imports. See table below:

Population
The 2002 national census estimated the population of Paidha at 24,079 and in 2010 the Uganda Bureau of Statistics, estimated the population of the town at 29,700. In 2011, UBOS estimated the mid-year population of Paidha at 30,500. In 2014, the population census put the population of the town at 33,426.

In 2015, the population of the town was projected at 32,300. In 2020, Paidha's mid-year population was projected at 37,500. It was calculated that the population of the town increased at an average annual rate of 3.0 percent, between 2015 and 2020.

Points of interest
(3) Paidha Primary Teachers College, a public teacher training college administered by the Ministry of Education and Sports (Uganda). (4) Nyagak Power Station, a 3.5 megawatt hydropower station operated by WENRECO, a subsidiary of Industrial Promotion Services (4) Nyagak III Power Station, a 4.36 megawatt hydropower station under development by the Uganda Electricity Generation Company Limited. (5) Paidha Health Centre III.

See also
List of power stations in Uganda
List of cities and towns in Uganda

References

Works cited

External links
 Photo of Paidha in 2004

Democratic Republic of the Congo–Uganda border crossings
Zombo District
West Nile sub-region
Populated places in Northern Region, Uganda